Tarsozeuzera fuscipars is a moth in the family Cossidae. It was described by George Hampson in 1892. It is found in southern India, Malaysia, Borneo, Vietnam, Thailand and Yunnan, China.

References

Zeuzerinae
Moths described in 1892